Daniel Chester French (April 20, 1850 – October 7, 1931) was an American sculptor of the late nineteenth and early twentieth centuries, best known for his 1874 sculpture The Minute Man in Concord, Massachusetts, and his 1920 monumental statue of Abraham Lincoln in the Lincoln Memorial in Washington, D.C.

Family
French was the son of Anne Richardson (1811–1856), daughter of William Merchant Richardson (1774–1838), chief justice of New Hampshire; and of Henry Flagg French  (1813–1885). His siblings were Henriette Van Mater French Hollis (1839–1911), Sarah Flagg French Bartlett (1846–1883), and William M.R. French (1843–1914). He was the uncle of Senator Henry F. Hollis.

Life and career
French was born in Exeter, New Hampshire, to Henry Flagg French (1813–1885), a lawyer, judge, Assistant US Treasury Secretary, and author of a book that described the French drain, and his wife Anne Richardson. In 1867, French moved with his family to Concord, Massachusetts, where he was a neighbor and friend of Ralph Waldo Emerson, and the Alcott family. His decision to pursue sculpting was influenced by Louisa May Alcott's sister May Alcott.

French's early education included training in anatomy with William Rimmer and in drawing with William Morris Hunt. French spent a year studying at the Massachusetts Institute of Technology, and also several years in Florence, Italy, studying in the studio of Thomas Ball. French first earned acclaim for The Minute Man, commissioned by the town of Concord, Massachusetts, which was unveiled April 19, 1875, on the centenary of the Battle of Lexington and Concord. He soon established his own studio, first in Washington, DC, moving later to Boston and then to New York City. French's reputation grew with his Statue of the Republic for the World's Columbian Exposition of 1893, in Chicago. Other memorable works by French include:  the First Division Monument and the Butt-Millet Memorial Fountain in Washington; John Harvard, Cambridge, Massachusetts; bronze doors for the Boston Public Library; and Four Continents at the US Custom House, New York (now the Alexander Hamilton US Custom House). In addition to the Lincoln Memorial, French collaborated with architect Henry Bacon on numerous memorials around the country and on the Dupont Circle fountain in Washington, DC.

In 1893, French was a founding member of the National Sculpture Society, and he was appointed a Fellow of the American Academy of Arts and Sciences in 1913. French also became a member of the National Academy of Design (1901), the American Academy of Arts and Letters (which awarded him the Gold Medal for Sculpture in 1917), the Architectural League, and the Accademia di San Luca, of Rome. He was a trustee of the Metropolitan Museum of Art in New York City, and a co-founder of the American Academy in Rome. He was a Chevalier of the French Legion of Honor and was awarded a medal of honor from the Paris Exposition of 1900; he also was granted honorary degrees from Dartmouth, Yale, Harvard, and Columbia universities. He was a founding member of the U.S. Commission of Fine Arts, serving from 1910 to 1915, including as chairman from 1912 to 1915.

In 1917, French and a colleague, H. Augustus Lukeman, designed the Pulitzer Prize gold medal presented to laureates. French designed the side of the prize with Benjamin Franklin on it, while Lukeman created the iconic design of the printing press and the wording on the award: "For disinterested and meritorious public service rendered by an American newspaper during the year….". In collaboration with Edward Clark Potter he modeled the George Washington statue, commissioned by a group that called itself "The Association of American Women for the Erection of a Statue of Washington in Paris" and unveiled in the Place d'Iena in Paris, France, in 1900; the General Grant statue in Fairmount Park, Philadelphia, commissioned by the Association for Public Art (formerly the Fairmount Park Art Association); and the equestrian statue of Joseph Hooker in Boston.

French was one of many sculptors who frequently employed Audrey Munson as a model; another frequent sitter was Hettie Anderson. Together with Walter Leighton Clark and others, he was also one of the founders of the Berkshire Playhouse, which later became the Berkshire Theatre Festival.
In 1917, Harvard's citation in conferring an honorary Master of Arts referred to his statue of Emerson when it called him "a sculptor, whose skillful hand, unlike that of the friend whom he portrayed, has not been stopped but spared to adorn our land by the creation of his art". French also taught; among his pupils was the sculptor Edith Howland.

French died in Stockbridge, Massachusetts, in 1931 at age 81 and was buried in Sleepy Hollow Cemetery, Concord.

Legacy
Chesterwood, French's summer home and studio – designed by his architect friend and frequent collaborator Henry Bacon – is now a historic site owned and operated by the National Trust for Historic Preservation.
In 1940, French was selected as one of five artists to be honored in the 35-stamp "Famous Americans" series.
Chester French was an American indie band named for the artist.
 "Daniel Chester French: American Sculptor" (2022) is a documentary film by Eduardo Montes-Bradley produced in association with Chesterwood and the National Trust for Historic Preservation.HD, 60 minutes.

Works

Notable public monuments 

The Minute Man at the Old North Bridge in Concord, Massachusetts, (1874)
Bust of Major General William Francis Bartlett at Memorial Hall, Harvard University, (1881)
John Harvard, Harvard Yard in Cambridge, Massachusetts, (1884)
Lewis Cass, National Statuary Hall, Washington DC, (1889)
Thomas Hopkins Gallaudet and Alice Cogswell (1889), Gallaudet University, Washington, DC
Thomas Starr King monument San Francisco, California, (1891)
Statue of The Republic, the colossal centerpiece of the World's Columbian Exposition, Chicago, 1893. His 24-foot gilt-bronze reduced version made in 1918 survives in Chicago.
John Boyle O'Reilly Memorial, intersection of Boylston Street and the Fenway in Boston, Massachusetts, (1897)
Rufus Choate memorial, Old Suffolk County Court House, Boston, Massachusetts, (1898)
Richard Morris Hunt Memorial, on the perimeter wall of Central Park, at 5th Avenue at 70th Street, opposite the Frick Collection,  in New York City, (1900)
Commodore George H. Perkins Monument at the New Hampshire State House, Concord, New Hampshire (1902)
Alma Mater (1903), on the campus of Columbia University in New York City
Statue of Wendell Phillips, Public Garden in Boston, Massachusetts
 The Four Continents – Asia, America, Europe, and Africa, a group of four statues outside the National Museum of the American Indian at the Alexander Hamilton U.S. Custom House, Manhattan, NYC (1907)
George Robert White Memorial, Public Garden in Boston, Massachusetts
Statue of Samuel Spencer, first president of Southern Railway, located in front of Goode Building (Norfolk Southern offices) on Peachtree Street in Midtown Atlanta, Georgia, (1910)
August Meyer Memorial, 10th and The Paseo, Kansas City, Missouri (1909)
 James Oglethorpe Monument, Chippewa Square, Savannah, Georgia (1910)
Standing Lincoln at the Nebraska State Capitol, Lincoln, Nebraska, (1912)
Brooklyn and Manhattan, seated figures from the Manhattan Bridge, Brooklyn Museum in Brooklyn, New York, (1915)
Minuteman, Henry Bacon designer, Jno. Williams, Inc. (NY) founder, Danville, Illinois. (1915)
The Spirit of Life, memorial to Spencer Trask, in Saratoga Springs, New York, at Congress Park, 1915
Abraham Lincoln in the Lincoln Memorial (1914–22), executed by the Piccirilli Brothers.
The Weaver, outside the Peace Dale Library in South Kingstown, Rhode Island (1919).
Marquis de Lafayette Memorial, on the perimeter of Prospect Park (Brooklyn), at 9th Street and Prospect Park West, Brooklyn, New York, (1917)
Samuel Francis du Pont Memorial Fountain, Dupont Circle, Washington DC (1921)
Alfred Tredway White Memorial, Brooklyn Botanic Garden, Henry Bacon architect (1921)
Russell Alger Memorial Fountain, Grand Circus Park, Detroit, Michigan (1921).
Marquis de Lafayette Statue, Lafayette College campus, Easton, Pennsylvania (1921). 
Gale Park War Memorial & Park, Exeter, New Hampshire (1922)
Bust of Washington Irving and reliefs of Boabdil and Rip Van Winkle for the Washington Irving Memorial, Irvington, New York, (1927)
Beneficence, Ball State University in Muncie, Indiana. (1930)
William Henry Seward Memorial in Florida, New York (1930)
Death and the Wounded Soldier aka Death and Youth, The Chapel of Saint Peter and Saint Paul, St. Paul's School, Concord, New Hampshire
James Woods, “Uncle Jimmy” Green, University of Kansas, Lawrence, KS. (1924)
Gen. William Franklin Draper, Draper Memorial Park, Milford, Massachusetts. (1912)

Gallery

Architectural sculpture

Peace and Vigilance (alternatively America at War and Peace) US Customhouse & Post Office, St. Louis, Missouri, Alfred B. Mullett architect (1876–1882)
Pediment, New Hampshire Historic Society Building, Concord, New Hampshire, Guy Lowell, architect    (1909–1911)
Bronze doors, Boston Public Library, Boston, Massachusetts, McKim, Mead & White architects, (1884–1904)
Justice, Appellate Division Courthouse of New York State, Manhattan, New York, James Brown Lord architect (1900)
Four Continents, Alexander Hamilton U.S. Custom House, Manhattan, New York, Cass Gilbert architect, (1904, with Adolph A. Weinman)
Progress of the State, quadriga, Six statues on entablature, Minnesota State Capitol, St. Paul, Minnesota, Cass Gilbert architect (1907)
Jurisprudence and Commerce, Federal Building, Cleveland, Ohio, Arnold Brunner architect (1910)
John Hampden, and Edward I, two attic figures, Cuyahoga County Courthouse, Cleveland, Ohio, Lehman & Schmidt architects (1908, 1911)
Attic Figures, pediment, Brooklyn Museum, NYC, McKim, Mead & White architects (1912)
Wisconsin, figure surmounting the dome, Wisconsin State Capitol, Madison, Wisconsin, George B. Post architect (1914)
Abraham Lincoln (1920), Lincoln Memorial, Washington, DC, Henry Bacon architect (1914–1922)
Peace, sculpture for the Admiral George Dewey Triumphal Arch and Colonnade that was built in Madison Square in Manhattan, New York, in 1900.
DeWitt Clinton, one of three statues prepared in 1903 for the New York Chamber of Commerce and Industry Building at 65 Liberty Street, Manhattan, New York. The statues were removed in 1926.
Greek Epic; Lyric Poetry, and Religion. Sculptures for the 1908 Brooklyn Institute of Arts and Sciences building on Eastern Parkway in Brooklyn, New York.
Power and Wisdom. Sculpture for the 1919 First World War Memorial. Since destroyed.

Cemetery monuments
Death and the Sculptor, a memorial for the grave of the sculptor Martin Milmore in the Forest Hills cemetery, Boston; this received a medal of honor at Paris, in 1900. (1893)
Clark Memorial, Forest Hills Cemetery, Jamaica Plain, Massachusetts, (1894)
Chapman Memorial, Forest Home Cemetery, Milwaukee, Wisconsin, (1897)
Angel of Peace – George Robert White,  Forest Hills Cemetery, Jamaica Plain, Massachusetts, (1898)
Ruth Anne Dodge Memorial, Council Bluffs, Iowa. Often referred to as the "Black Angel". (1918)
Memory, the Marshall Field Memorial, Graceland Cemetery, Chicago, Henry Bacon, architect (1906)
Slocum Memorial, Forest Hills Cemetery in Jamaica Plain, Massachusetts
Melvin Memorial, Sleepy Hollow Cemetery, Concord, Massachusetts, Henry Bacon, architect (1906–1908)

Selected museum pieces
The Angel of Death and the Sculptor, Metropolitan Museum of Art in New York City
Memory, Metropolitan Museum of Art, marble carved by the Piccirilli Brothers, 1917–19, from a bronze of 1886–87, revised in 1909.
Mourning Victory, Metropolitan Museum of Art in New York City
And the Sons of God saw the Daughters of Men That They Were Fair…, For French, this was an unusually erotic sculpture depicting the verse from Genesis whereby a fallen angel seduces a mortal woman thus producing the mythical Nephilim, Corcoran Gallery of Art; Washington DC, signed and dated 1923.

Miscellaneous pieces 
The Chicago Incendiary: edition of a small bisque statuette depicting the cow alleged to have started the Great Chicago Fire of 1871
The Minute Man: depicted on a US postage stamp issued in 1925, commemorating the Battles of Lexington and Concord
Bust of John Brewster, who endowed Brewster Academy in 1887.

References 
 Citations

Further reading 
 Buck, Diane M. and Virginia A. Palmer, Outdoor Sculpture in Milwaukee: A Cultural and Historical Guidebook, The State Historical Society of Wisconsin, Madison,  1995
 Caffin, Charles H., American Masters of Sculpture, Doubleday, Page & Company, New York 1913
 Caffin, in International Studio, volumes xx (1903), lx (1910), and lxvi (1912)
 Carlock, Marty, A Guide to Public Art in Greater Boston from Newburyport to Plymouth, The Harvard Common Press, Boston Massachusetts,  1988
 Chesterwood Archives, Geographical List of Works: DRAFT, unpublished manuscript, April 14, 1993
 Coughlan, in Magazine of Art (1901)
 Craven, Wayne, Sculpture in America, Thomas Y. Crowell Co, NY, NY 1968
 Cresson, Margaret French, Journey into Fame: The Life of Daniel Chester French, Harvard University Press, Cambridge, MA,  1947
 Dearinger, David, Daniel Chester French: The Female Form Revealed, Boston Athenaeum, 2016
 Hucke, Matt and Ursela Bielski, Graveyards of Chicago: the People, History, Art and Lore of Cook County Cemeteries,  Lake Claremont Press, Chicago,  1999
 Kvaran, Einar Einarsson, Architectural Sculpture in America
 Lanctot, Barbara, A Walk Through Graceland Cemetery,  Chicago Architectural Foundation, Chicago,  Illinois,  1988
 Richman, Michael, Daniel Chester French: An American Sculptor, The Preservation Press, Washington DC, 1976
 Taft, Lorado, The History of American Sculpture, MacMillan Co., New York,  NY 1925
 Tolles, Thayer. "Daniel Chester French (1850–1931)". In Heilbrunn Timeline of Art History. New York: The Metropolitan Museum of Art, 2000–. (June 2010)
 Wilson, Susan, Garden of Memorials: A Guide to Historic Forest Hills, Forest Hills Educational Trust

External links 

 
 Daniel Chester French: Sculpture In Situ
 Chesterwood Estate and Museum—Summer home, studio, and garden of sculptor Daniel Chester French
 "F" (pp. 158–182; see p. 177) in Members of the American Academy of Arts & Sciences: 1780–2012
 Daniel Chester French exhibition brochure from the Metropolitan Museum of Art
 "Chesterwood: The Workshop of an American Sculptor"; "Chesterwood: The Workshop of an American Sculptor – A Teaching with Historic Places Lesson Plan", a National Park Service Teaching with Historic Places (TwHP) lesson plan

1850 births
1931 deaths
19th-century American sculptors
19th-century American male artists
20th-century American sculptors
20th-century American male artists
American architectural sculptors
American male sculptors
Artists of the Boston Public Library
Fellows of the American Academy of Arts and Sciences
Massachusetts Institute of Technology alumni
Members of the American Academy of Arts and Letters
National Sculpture Society members
People from Concord, Massachusetts
People from Exeter, New Hampshire
People from Stockbridge, Massachusetts
Sculptors from New Hampshire